Starokuruchevo (İśke Qoros) is a rural locality (a selo) and the administrative center of Starokuruchevsky Selsoviet, Bakalinsky District, Bashkortostan, Russia. The population was 1,478 as of 2010. There are 20 streets.

Geography 
Starokuruchevo is located 21 km southeast of Bakaly (the district's administrative centre) by road. Kilkabyzovo is the nearest rural locality.

References 

Rural localities in Bakalinsky District